Max Baer may refer to:

 Max Baer (boxer) (1909–1959), American boxing world champion
 Max Baer Jr. (born 1937), son of the boxer, American actor on TV's The Beverly Hillbillies
 Max Baer (judge) (1947–2022), American jurist, Pennsylvania Supreme Court Justice